Sempervivium calcareum, the houseleek, is a species of flowering plant in the stonecrop family Crassulaceae, native to the southern Alps in Europe. An evergreen succulent perennial, it has a rosette with thick leaves that store water. The leaves are usually green with reddish-purple tips. This plant reproduces with asexual budding and monocarpic sexual reproduction. 

Sempervivum calcareum is cultivated as an ornamental garden plant. It is suitable for a well-drained spot in full sun, such as a rockery. The cultivars ‘Extra’, ‘Guillaumes’ and 'Sir William Lawrence' have gained the Royal Horticultural Society’s Award of Garden Merit.

References

calcareum